The Faculty of Medical Leadership and Management (FMLM) is an intercollegiate professional body which promotes excellence in leadership on behalf of all doctors in the United Kingdom. The faculty was formed in 2011 and has 2,600 members, who are Members or accredited as Fellows in increasing seniority: Associate Fellow (AFFMLM), Fellow (FFMLM) or Senior Fellow (SFFMLM).

History
The faculty was established in October 2011 by all the medical royal colleges and faculties with endorsement from the Academy of Medical Royal Colleges (AoMRC). As a professional body for the setting and maintaining of standards, the faculty was seen as having an important role in helping medical leaders to be seen as skilled professionals rather than gifted amateurs.

It maintains a vision: 'to inspire and promote excellence in medical leadership to drive continuous improvement in health and healthcare in the UK.'

The founding chief executive is Mr Peter Lees who was made an MBE for services to medical leadership in 2021 as CEO of FMLM. The founding chairman was Professor Sir Neil Douglas.

Dame Clare Marx was a former Chair of FMLM, and was instrumental in establishing the national clinical fellows initiative. Fellows joining the  General Medical Council  cohort from 2018 are known as the Marx clinical fellows.

At its inception, the faculty put forward the view that medical leadership would have to become a true professional discipline to be able to deal with the challenges which the health service faces.

The faculty has also commented on creating the right culture within organisations that provide healthcare and training.

Governance

The current Medical Director and Interim CEO is Dr Paul Evans and the Chair is Professor Mayur Lakhani CBE.

Dr Rich Withnall was due to join FMLM as permanent CEO in June 2023.

FMLM is governed by a Board of Trustees.

While the organisation was becoming established, the faculty's governing body was the Founding Council, with representatives drawn from all of the member Colleges and Faculties. This arrangement was in place from May 2011 until March 2013, at which point the new Council took over. In January 2014, a Board of Trustees was established.

References

External links
 

Health in the London Borough of Camden
Learned societies of the United Kingdom
2011 establishments in the United Kingdom
Organisations based in the London Borough of Camden
Organizations established in 2011